Isabelle Le Maresquier was a French equestrian and a prominent socialite of Parisian high society from the late 1950s and during the 1960s.

Horseriding
A noted equestrian during the 1960s and 1970s, she became the first woman to win in a mixed horserace on 8 November 1975.

Family
Born in Paris, she was a daughter of a prominent architect Noël Le Maresquier and Spanish noblewoman Conchita López de Tejada, granddaughter of a prominent architect Charles Lemaresquier, and a niece of French Prime Minister Michel Debré. Her family was referred to as French "state nobility" by Pierre Bourdieu. She was the mother-in-law of the Chancellor of Austria, Alexander Schallenberg.

References

French equestrians